The Order of Military Merit is a military honour for merit that is, within the Canadian system of honours, the second highest order administered by the governor in Council, on behalf of the Canadian monarch.

Created in 1972 to replace a grouping within the Order of Canada, the order was established to recognize members of the Canadian Forces—either regular or reserve personnel—who have demonstrated dedication and devotion beyond the call of duty, achieving conspicuous merit and exceptional military service. The three tiers of the order are Commander, Officer, and Member; specific individuals may be given extraordinary and deserving non-Canadians granted with honorary appointment into each grade.

Grades and precedence
The Canadian monarch—presently  —is seen as the fount of honour and is thus at the apex of the Order of Military Merit as its sovereign, followed by the governor general of Canada who serves as the fellowship's chancellor, and the chief of the Defence Staff who is the principal commander. Thereafter follow three grades—each having accordant post-nominal letters that are the same in both English and French. Additionally, any governor general, former governor general, or member of the Canadian Royal Family in the Canadian Forces may be appointed as an extraordinary commander, officer, or member. There are no limits to the population of any grade, and promotions are possible, though this is ordinarily not done within five years of the initial appointment. Any person thus honoured must return their lower grade insignia, as no member may at any time hold more than one appointment in the organization. Further, within the order of precedence for Canadian honours, each grade of the Order of Military Merit precedes a similar grade of the Order of Merit of the Police Forces, with commanders succeeding the members of the Order of Canada.

Insignia

Upon admission into the Order of Military Merit, members are presented the appropriate insignia, though these remain property of the Crown. The Sovereign's insignia is a jewelled, 18kt gold crown of rubies, emeralds, and sapphires, from which is suspended a blue enamelled cross pattée with four equal arms and three diamonds between each. At the centre is a disc bearing a maple leaf in pavé-laid rubies on a white enamel background, surrounded at its edge by a red enamel ring (annulus) bearing the words MERIT • MÉRITE • CANADA. The Chancellor wears the badge of a Commander, though is also, upon installation as governor general, granted a livery collar for wear at Order of Military Merit investiture ceremonies; this is composed of a series of gold medallions, and supports an enamel rendition of the shield of the Royal Arms of Canada, from which the governor general's badge is suspended.

The badges for inductees are of a similar design to the sovereign's badge, though without precious stones, and slight differences for each grade. For Commanders, the emblem is gilt with a red enamel maple leaf in the gold central disk; for Officers, it is gilt with a gold maple leaf; and for Members, both the badge itself and the maple leaf are silver. The reverse bears only a serial number, and all are topped by a St. Edward's Crown, symbolizing that the order is headed by the sovereign. These insignia are worn with the order's ribbon, which is blue with golden edges. Commanders wear the badge at the neck while Officers and Members display theirs on the left breast on a medal bar, suspended by, respectively, a bar of gold or silver decorated with a laurel motif. Women in civilian dress may wear their emblems on a ribbon bow pinned at the left chest. The ribbon bar, worn for undress, is the same for each grade, save for a miniature blue cross pattée with a maple leaf, the colour of which matches that on the badge of the grade that the wearer was appointed to; someone who has been promoted within the order may wear on their ribbon bar the pins of all grades that they have occupied. These same miniatures also serves as a lapel pin for civilian wear.

With the patriation in 1988 of oversight of arms to Canada through the Canadian Heraldic Authority, the constitution of the Order of Military Merit was amended to include the entitlement of all inductees to petition the Chief Herald of Canada for personal armorial bearings, should they not already possess any. Commanders may receive supporters, and all members may have the escutcheon (shield) of their arms encircled with a blue ribbon bearing the order's mottoOFFICIUM ANTE COMMODUMin gold, and from which is suspended a rendition of the holder's Order of Military Merit badge.

Eligibility and appointment
For military ranks of colonel and above, recommendations for appointment to the Order of Military Merit are made by a commanding officer or military advisory committee to the chief of the Defence Staff, who then forwards the name or names to the governor general; per the King's Regulations and Orders for the Canadian Forces, neither the nominee, nor any member of his or her family, can be notified or otherwise made aware that they have been suggested for induction into the order. Nominations are processed by the Advisory Committee for the Order of Military Merit, which is a part of the Chancellery of Honours at Rideau Hall, and has six members: one appointed by the governor general, four by the chief of the Defence Staff, and the chief of the Defence Staff him or herself; the secretary to the Governor General is Secretary General of the Order of Military Merit.

Appointments take place annually and are limited to 0.1% of the previous year's total population of the Canadian Forces, including reserves; for example, the 60th list included 111 appointments in 2010. Submissions for appointments must be representative of the whole of the Canadian Forces population and nominators are advised that appointments are not necessarily commensurate with senior rank and long service.  Many outstanding master seaman, petty officers, and lieutenants are as deserving as senior officers and non-commissioned members. The level of Member is generally reserved for non-commissioned members of the forces, petty officers, and commissioned officers up to the rank of army or air force captain or navy lieutenant, while no more than six percent of those appointed to the order in total may be inducted as Commanders, and no more than 30% may be made Officers. Appointments are also not made posthumously, though members of foreign armed forces can be admitted as honorary members in any grade. A total of 5,285 appointments and promotions to the order have been made in the fifty years from its inception in 1972 to 2022; 300 Commanders, 1,377 Officers and 3,608 members.

The governor general may, by ordinance, remove someone from the order. On 22 December 2014, the membership of Lieutenant-Colonel Deborah Miller was terminated by Governor General David Johnston in light of military disciplinary action Miller faced for wearing medals and military insignia she did not earn.

See also

 Meritorious Service Decoration

Notes

References

Further reading

External links

Military awards and decorations of Canada